Werner Lutz is a German rower.

At the 1974 World Junior Championships in Ratzeburg, Lutz won a silver medal with the men's eight. He won a gold medal at the 1979 World Rowing Championships in Bled with the men's coxed four. At the 1981 World Rowing Championships in Munich, he came fourth with the men's eight.

References

Year of birth missing (living people)
German male rowers
World Rowing Championships medalists for East Germany
Possibly living people